Philip Achille is a British harmonica player who attended Solihull School, a British private school in the West Midlands. He is currently studying chromatic harmonica at the Royal College of Music.

Achille is also able to play the bass and the saxophone, as well as the piano, employing both jazz and classical styles.

His recent achievements include:

National Harmonica League Player of the Year 2005 
World Youth Solo Chromatic Harmonica Champion 2005 
World Open Harmonica Champion 2005  
Tabor Foundation Award 2006 
Birmingham International Jazz Festival Young Musician 2006 
Eurovision Young Musician of the Year Finalist 2008
Achille was featured on the soundtrack for the 2007 movie Mr. Bean's Holiday.
Achille played Larry Adler's theme music from the British film comedy "Genevieve" with John Wilson's Ochestra at the BBC Proms at the Albert Hall, London, in 2007.
Achille played the introduction section for Jon Bon Jovi's finale of the Royal Variety Performance 2007.
Achille also played at Andrew Lloyd Webber's birthday celebration in Hyde Park in September 2008.
Achille performed with Lionel Richie during 2012 for his performance on Friday Night with Jonathan Ross and for a radio programme appearance on Heart FM 
Achille appeared on the CBeebies program ZingZillas on the episode "The Z Factor".

References

Year of birth missing (living people)
Living people
British harmonica players
People educated at Solihull School
Eurovision Young Musicians Finalists